Christi Coral Brereton (née Campbell; born 26 November 1992) is an English female kickboxer and muay thai fighter based in Okehampton. She has fought for a WBC Muaythai title. Christi Brereton is signed with kickboxing organisation Glory

She is the former WPMF, WBC Muaythai British Champion and Roar Combat League World Champion at super bantamweight.

WBC Muaythai ranks her as the #2 Super Bantamweight in the world, as of April 2020.

Personal life
Christi Brereton is a coach at Chaos Muay Thai Fitness and Competition Training Centre and is the co-owner of it, together with her trainer and partner Stephen Pender. The two of them are parents of a daughter. She is a qualified Fitness Gym Instructor.

Kickboxing career
Brereton made her professional debut against Kim Shannon, at 14 years of age. The fight ended in a draw.

In 2005, at the age of 15, Brereton faced Outi Louhimo for the WPMF Muaythai World title. She won a unanimous decision.

In 2013, she defeated Grace Spicer and Alexis Rufus to win the WBC Muaythai British and UKMF Women's British titles.

In 2016 she defeated Marina Zarogianni to win the Roar Combat League  Super Bantamweight title. She defended it three times, with unanimous decision wins over Josefine Lindgren Knutsson and Anaëlle Angerville, as well as a TKO win over Soraya Bucherie.

In 2019 she signed with Glory Kickboxing. She won a unanimous decision against Nicola Kaye in her first fight with the organization. In her second fight she lost a split decision against Sofia Olofsson. In her third fight she won a split decision over Sarah Moussaddak.

Championships and accomplishments
World Boxing Council Muaythai
WBC Muaythai British Title
One successful title defense
World Professional Muaythai Federation
WPMF Muay Thai World Super Bantamweight Championship
World Ring Sports Association
WRSA Muay Thai World Super Bantamweight Championship
Roar Combat League
RCL Super Bantamweight World Championship
Three title defenses

Kickboxing record

|-  bgcolor=
|-  bgcolor="#CCFFCC"
| 2019-10-12|| Win||align=left| Sarah Moussaddak || Glory 69: Düsseldorf || Düsseldorf, Germany || Decision (Split) || 3 || 3:00|| 21–6–1
|-
|-  bgcolor="#FFBBBB"
| 2019-05-17|| Loss||align=left| Sofia Olofsson || Glory 65: Utrecht || Utrecht, Netherlands || Decision (Split) || 3 || 3:00|| 20–6–1
|-
|-  bgcolor="#CCFFCC"
| 2018-11-23 || Win||align=left| Anaëlle Angerville || Roar Combat League 10 || Watford, England || Decision (Unanimous) || 5 || 3:00|| 20–5–1 
|-
! style=background:white colspan=9 |
|-
|-  bgcolor="#CCFFCC"
| 2018-06-02|| Win||align=left| Nicola Kaye || Glory 54: Birmingham || Birmingham, England || Decision (Unanimous) || 3 || 3:00|| 19–5–1 
|-
|-  bgcolor="#CCFFCC"
| 2017-10-14 || Win||align=left| Soraya Bucherie || Roar Combat League 7 || Watford, England || TKO (Punches and kicks) || 1 || 0:23|| 18–5–1 
|-
! style=background:white colspan=9 |
|-
|-  bgcolor="#CCFFCC"
|  2017-04-01 || Win||align=left| Huang Li || Wu Lin Feng 2017: China VS Europe || Henan, China || Decision (Unanimous) || 3 || 3:00|| 17–5–1
|-  bgcolor="#CCFFCC"
| 2016-10-22 || Win||align=left| Josefine Lindgren Knutsson || Roar Combat League 4 || Watford, England || Decision (Unanimous) || 5 || 3:00|| 16–5–1
|-
! style=background:white colspan=9 |
|-
|-  bgcolor="#CCFFCC"
| 2016-05-28 || Win||align=left| Marina Zarogianni || Roar Combat League 1 || Watford, England || TKO || 4 || || 15–5–1
|-
! style=background:white colspan=9 |
|-
|-  bgcolor="#CCFFCC"
|  2015-02-?|| Win||align=left| Alexandra Timar || Super MTC || Watford, England || Decision (Unanimous) || 1 || 1:54|| 14–5–1
|-
|-  bgcolor="#CCFFCC"
| 2014-11-30|| Win||align=left| Helen Wilson || Muay Thai Unleashed 4 || Wellington, England || TKO (Cuts) || 4 || 3:00|| 13–5–1
|-
! style=background:white colspan=9 |
|-
|-  bgcolor="#CCFFCC"
| 2014-10-19|| Win||align=left| Soraya Bucherie || Super MTC || London, England || Decision (Unanimous) || 5 || 3:00|| 12–5–1
|-
|-  bgcolor="#FFBBBB"
| 2014-07-09 || Loss||align=left| Jemyma Betrian || WCK Muay Thai: International Showdonw || Temecula, California, United States || TKO || 2 || 3:00|| 11–5–1
|-
! style=background:white colspan=9 |
|-
|-  bgcolor="#CCFFCC"
| 2014-02-22 || Win||align=left| Alexis Rufus || Muay Thai Unleashed II || Telford, England || Decision (Unanimous) || 5 || 2:00|| 11–4–1
|-
! style=background:white colspan=9 |
|-
|-  bgcolor="#CCFFCC"
| 2013-11-02 || Win||align=left| Grace Spicer || WBC National Title || London, England || Decision (Unanimous) || 5 || 2:00|| 9–4–1
|-
! style=background:white colspan=9 |
|-
|-  bgcolor="#CCFFCC"
| 2013-07-27 || Win||align=left| Amy Pirnie || PSP European title || Devon, England || Decision (Unanimous) || 5 || 2:00|| 8–4–1
|-
|-  bgcolor="#FFBBBB"
|  2013-06-29 || Loss||align=left| Denise Kielholtz || Enfusion Live 6 || London, England || Decision (Unanimous) || 3 || 3:00|| 7–4–1
|-
|-  bgcolor="#CCFFCC"
|  2010-04-12 || Win||align=left| Carla Sullivan || ? || London, England || Decision (Unanimous) || 5 || 2:00|| 7–3–1
|-
|-  bgcolor="#FFBBBB"
| 2009|| Loss||align=left| Amanda Kelly || ?|| ? || Decision (Unanimous) || 5 || 3:00|| 6–3–1
|-
|-  bgcolor="#CCFFCC"
| 2008|| Win||align=left| Jackie Short || ? || Birmingham, England || Decision (Unanimous) || 5 || 2:00|| 6–2–1
|-
|-  bgcolor="#FFBBBB"
| 14 Sep 2008|| Loss||align=left| Joanne Calderwood || ? || Glasgow, Scotland || Decision (Unanimous) || 5 || 2:00|| 5–2–1
|-
|-  bgcolor="#FFBBBB"
| 2008-05-27 || Loss||align=left| Ruth Ashdown || ? || London, England || Decision (Unanimous) || 2 || 3:00|| 5–1–1
|-
|-  bgcolor="#CCFFCC"
|  2007-04-12 || Win||align=left| Outi Louhimo || WPMF World title || ? || Decision (Unanimous) || 5 || 2:00|| 5–0–1
|-
! style=background:white colspan=9 |
|-
|-  bgcolor="#CCFFCC"
| ?|| Win||align=left| Cara Nodwell || ? || London, England || Decision (Unanimous) || 5 || 2:00|| 4–0–1
|-
|-  bgcolor="#CCFFCC"
| ?|| Win||align=left| Debbie McCulloch || ? || Manchester, England || Decision (Unanimous) || 5 || 2:00|| 3–0–1
|-  bgcolor="#CCFFCC"
| ?|| Win||align=left| Sophie Bowyer || ? || ? || Decision (Unanimous) || 5 || 2:00|| 2–0–1
|-  bgcolor="#CCFFCC"
| ?|| Win||align=left| Natasha Gold || ? || Southampton, England || Decision (Unanimous) || 5 || 2:00|| 1–0–1
|-  bgcolor="#c5d2ea"
| ?|| Draw||align=left| Kim Shannon || ? || Birmingham, England || Decision (Unanimous) || 5 || 2:00|| 0–0–1
|-
|-
| colspan=9 | Legend:

See also
List of female kickboxers

References

External links
 Christi Brereton at Awakening Fighters

1992 births
English female kickboxers
Featherweight kickboxers
Female Muay Thai practitioners
English Muay Thai practitioners
Sportspeople from Exeter
Glory kickboxers
Living people